Julius Lill (18 July 1878 Tartu – 1 February 1951 Stockholm) was an Estonian politician. He was a member of IV Riigikogu.

References

1878 births
1951 deaths
Members of the Riigikogu, 1929–1932